The Gray Sandstone Group is a late Silurian lithostratigraphic group (a sequence of rock strata) in west Wales. The strata are exposed in the coast around the Milford Haven area; outcrops occur either side of Marloes Bay. Besides quartzitic sandstones and mudstones, sandy rottenstones are found at outcrop. Fossils within the rottenstone beds include brachiopods and corals. The rocks of this group have also previously been known as the Gray Sandstone Series.

References

Silurian System of Europe
Geology of Wales
Geological groups of the United Kingdom